Jaime Woo is a Canadian writer and game developer. He is best known for his 2013 book Meet Grindr: How One App Changed the Way We Connect, an exploration of the impact of Grindr on social interaction in the gay male community which was a shortlisted nominee for the Lambda Literary Award for non-fiction at the 26th Lambda Literary Awards.

Woo was a cofounder of the Toronto-area video game convention Gamercamp, created the For All Gamers Sake archive of LGBT-themed indie video games, and was a speaker at the 2014 edition of GaymerX.

He has also contributed to publications including Hazlitt, the Financial Post, The Globe and Mail, The Daily Dot, Huffington Post and The Grid.

References

External links

21st-century Canadian non-fiction writers
Canadian gay writers
Writers from Toronto
Living people
21st-century Canadian male writers
Canadian writers of Asian descent
Canadian technology writers
Canadian male non-fiction writers
Year of birth missing (living people)
21st-century Canadian LGBT people